

Marutūāhu, Marutūahu or Marutuahu is a collective of the Māori iwi (tribe) of the Hauraki region of New Zealand. The confederation is made up of the tribes of Ngāti Maru, Ngāti Paoa, Ngāti Tamaterā, Ngāti Whanaunga and Ngāti Rongoū.

The Marutūāhu tribes are descended from Marutūāhu, a son of Hotunui. Ngāti Maru tradition says that Hotunui arrived in New Zealand on the Tainui canoe around 1300, but Pei Te Hurinui Jones reports that he was the son of Uenuku-te-rangi-hōkā, son of Whatihua and thus a fifteen-generation descendant of the captain of Tainui canoe, Hoturoa. In this case, he would have lived at the end of the sixteenth century. Either way, the Marutūāhu tribes are therefore part of the Tainui group of tribes. The Marutūāhu confederation is also part of the Hauraki collective of tribes.

Marutūāhu married two sisters, Hineurunga and Paremoehau, and had four sons:
Tamatepō, ancestor of Ngāti Rongoū
Tamaterā, ancestor of Ngāti Tamaterā
Whanaunga, ancestor of Ngāti Whanaunga
Te Ngako, ancestor of Ngāti Maru
Paremoehau was mother of the older three sons, while Hineurunga was the mother of Te Ngako. Although Te Ngako was younger than his half-brothers, Hineurunga was the tuakana (eldest sister), which gave Te Ngako the mana of being tuakana to his older brothers. Hence his descendants are called Ngāti Maru, not Ngāti Te Ngako.
The Hauraki Ngāti Maru say that the Ngāti Maru of Taranaki are descended from Marutūāhu's brother Maruwharanui, but the Taranaki Ngāti Maru appear to give him a different parentage. The descendants of a third brother, Marukōpiri, settled on the Whanganui river.

Sources
A Tainui account of Marutūāhu is recorded by Pei Te Hurinui Jones but, unusually, he does not report his source. It also appears in S. Percy Smith's History and Traditions of the Maoris of the west coast North Island of New Zealand prior to 1840, published in 1910. Hauraki Ngāti Maru versions are recorded by George Grey in 1853 and by John White in 1888.

See also
List of Māori iwi

Footnotes

Bibliography

 
Iwi and hapū